Leflore County High School or LCHS is a public high school in Itta Bena, Mississippi, United States. It is a part of the Greenwood-Leflore Consolidated School District.

History
Previously the school was in the Leflore County School District. On July 1, 2019, the Leflore County and Greenwood districts consolidated into the Greenwood-Leflore School District.

Campus 
Leflore County High is located in the small rural town of Itta Bena, Mississippi in Leflore County on Lakeside Drive. On campus, Leflore County Elementary, which serves pre-K through 6th grade, is also located on the back end of the school.

References

External links 
 

Public high schools in Mississippi
Schools in Leflore County, Mississippi